Metalnikov is a Russian masculine surname, its feminine counterpart is Metalnikova. It may refer to
Budimir Metalnikov (1925–2001), Soviet screenwriter 
Inna Metalnikova (born 1991), Ukrainian track cyclist
Leonid Metalnikov (born 1990), Kazakhstani ice hockey defenceman

Russian-language surnames